TNT Sports Chile is a privately owned sports pay TV channel of Chile. It launched in 2003 and it was controlled by the Asociación Nacional de Fútbol Profesional, the Chilean football league after of the authorization of sale by the FNE (Fiscalia Nacional Económica) in Chile. Now is operated by Warner Bros. Discovery International. Originally called CDF (acronym of Canal del Fútbol), it was renamed on January 17, 2021.

History

Created at the beginning of year 2003 to transmit the national championship, after finalizing contracts of the ANFP with Fox Sports, the satellite signal SKY and National Television of Chile, with which a new agreement was not obtained and it discarded to make a licitation. The leadership headed by Reinaldo Sanchez decided to execute the idea of Clearly consisting of Jorge which the clubs obtain all the benefits of the televising trasmisiones without an intermediary who only took to a part when giving a fixed floor.

At first one projected that the channel is obtained through the operators of cable and mediantes decoders of a UHF signal after the payment of a monthly sum. Finally it was decided on the launching of an operator of satellite television own Zap, in December 2003, besides operating in the television by cable. In 2007, Zap was acquired by the Mexican Telmex, and so it happened to be called Telmex TV. From 2006 Basic signal CDF is sent renombrando first channel CDF Premium. The four parties per date of the championship of first division and some parties of the Chilean Selection of Soccer have the same programming excepting that emits live TNT Sports HD & TNT Sports 2. The Channel of soccer transmits the parties of the Chilean championship of soccer of the First and Second Divisions. In addition it emits programs of European soccer and other sports. From year 2007, it transmits all the mundialistas parties of classificatorias to South Africa 2010.

Besides the soccers match of the Chilean match, TNT Sports has a diverse programming for its two channels (Básico and Premium), the majority related to soccer. In the Name of Soccer - Pablo Flamm TNT Sports Leads Radio - Relator: Sebastián Rockrose, Commentator: Horacio Rivas, Reporter: Manuel Goatherd Compact of parties of the Closing 2008 Relatores: Edgardo Diaz, Sebastián Jara and Javier Muñoz; Commentators: South American Horacio Rivas and Eliminatory Rodrigo Astorga for South Africa 2010 (2007–2009) Ferro of heart - the life in green Leads Rodrigo Abugarade One by one. Mission Rugby Return In Liga Freestyle TV It arrives of the Ball.

Like owner of the rights, the TNT Sports has the faculty to operate the rights of opening of goals, something unpublished in Chile until 2005. In that one year Channel 13 a legal action on the part of the rest of the channels was adjudged for the first time to the goals generating looking for to protect the right to the information. Nevertheless, the failure was favorable to the TNT Sports  seating jurisprudence on the matter. Channel 13 exclusively emitted the goals during the week ends until the midnight of Sundays, when the rest of the channels was qualified to only show the goals but in informative programs. The rest of the programs, even the sport ones, had the option to pay a sum to the CDF to emit the goals.  In 2007 after failing an attempt of collective purchase on the part of National Television of Chile, Chilevisión and Mega, this last private network adjudged the compact rights of emission of the parties the day Sunday, before the rest of the channels that will be able to only exhibit the goals during 7 days as of Monday subsequent to the date, under the same conditions that in 2005. The agreement was until end of 2008. This in spite of the efforts and promises of the new president of the ANFP, Harold Mayne-Nicholls to obtain that the goals are in all the open channels.

TNT Sports is available via cable or satellite.

Sports Coverage

Football (On TNT Sports) 

FIFA Club World Cup (all eight matches live in 2019 and 2020 editions, also available for Argentina viewers)
Chilean Primera División (Eight matches per matchday are broadcast live on TNT Sports HD & TNT Sports 2 (Premium signals) or TNT Sports 3 (Basic signal)) (Match Simulcast live on CDF Básico).
 Primera B (Five matches per matchday are broadcast live on TNT Sports HD & TNT Sports 2 (Premium signals) or TNT Sports 3 (Basic signal)) (Match simulcast live on TNT Sports 3). 
 Finals of Third Division (Matches of 1st Leg and 2nd Leg are broadcast live on TNT Sports HD & TNT Sports 2 (Premium signals) or TNT Sports 3 (Basic signal)). 
FIFA World Cup qualification (CONMEBOL : All the games)
 Copa América

Programs 

 TNT Data Sports
 Todos Somos Técnicos 
 Goals of First División (Campeonato Nacional de Primera A) 
 Goals of Second División (Campeonato Nacional de Primera B)
 Pelota Parada
 TNT Data Sports Primera B
 TNT Sports REACTS
 Show de Goles
 Pasaporte Qatar
 La Previa

Notable members
 Claudio Palma

Former members
 Marcelo González Godoy
 Juan Carlos Villalta
 Pablo Flamm

See also
 Television in Chile

References

External links
 

Television networks in Chile
TNT Sports (Chile)
Television channels and stations established in 2003
Spanish-language television stations
Companies based in Santiago
Sports television networks
Association football on television